"Living in a Dream" is the first single from Canadian alternative rock band Finger Eleven's sixth album, Life Turns Electric. It was released in August 2010. This song, along with "Paralyzer" from their last album, has a "dance-rock" feel to the track.

The song failed to be as big a hit internationally as the last album's lead single, "Paralyzer" was, failing to hit the Billboard Hot 100 in the United States and reaching the top five on any rock format.

The song was used as the official theme song for the 2011 WWE Royal Rumble event that is produced by WWE.

Music video
The music video released on October 21, 2010. It shows the band performing in a dark room.

Chart performance
"Living In a Dream" did moderately well on the rock tracks, although underperforming the lead single "Paralyzer" from their previous album Them vs. You vs. Me. In the U.S., the single had strong debuts on both the Billboard Hot Mainstream Rock Tracks and Alternative Songs. "Living in a Dream" eventually become a top 10 hit on the Hot Mainstream Rock Tracks and a top 15 hit on the Alternative Songs chart. The single failed to chart on the Hot 100, though. The song has also gone top 50 in Canada.

Charts

References

2010 singles
Finger Eleven songs
2010 songs
Songs written by Gregg Wattenberg
Wind-up Records singles